The Fox's Summer (Chinese: 狐狸的夏天) is a 2017 Chinese television series based on the online novel titled When the President Falls in Love (当总裁恋爱时) by Shen Cangmei. The series received praise for its witty dialogue and unique storyline, and ranked atop the ratings chart.

Synopsis
Gu Chengze, the adopted son of the Gu family, is the CEO of Gu Mall Corporation. Mrs. Gu wishes for her biological grandson, Gu Jinyu, to take over the company; and Chengze is tasked to guide the rightful heir towards becoming a respectful businessman. During this time, he meets fashion designer Li Yanshu and discovers that she is Jinyu's ex-girlfriend. He decides to hire her aboard to motivate Jinyu, who still harbors feelings for Yanshu. The plan works; Jinyu decides to join the company and pursue her. When Mrs. Gu finds out about Jinyu's feelings for Yanshu, she was livid and tells Chengze to separate the both of them. This creates an opportunity for Chengze and Yanshu to get closer to each other, and they fell in love. With the help of Yanshu, Chengze overcomes many difficult situations. Jinyu, after undergoing life-changing experiences, also matures and successfully took over his company.

Broadcast

Cast

 Jiang Chao as Gu Chengze (The Rabbit), CEO of a company who is a human lie detector and has obsessive–compulsive disorder.
 Tan Songyun as Li Yanshu (The Fox), a fashion designer and pathological liar. She is independent and adapts well to any situations.
 Daniel Zhang Xin as Gu Jinyu, an easygoing and flamboyant man who does not take work seriously. He only loves his first girlfriend, Yanshu.
 Wang Yanzhi as Han Junyao, the self-centered heiress of Han Corporation who has liked to pick on Yanshu since their high school days.
 Dong Hui as Mrs. Gu
 Ji Xiaobing as Gao Yang
 Zui Ju as Qiao Na

Production
Kim Tae-hwan was originally cast as the male lead, but was replaced by Jiang Chao due to China's ban on Korean-Chinese co-production and celebrities.

Soundtrack

Remake
This series was remade in Thailand as You're my heart beat and aired on PPTV on March 2, 2021.

Awards and nominations

References

2017 Chinese television series debuts
Chinese romantic comedy television series
Television shows based on Chinese novels
Chinese web series
Tencent original programming
2017 web series debuts
Television series based on Internet-based works